Eli Ives (February 7, 1779 – October 8, 1861) was an American physician.

He was son of Dr Levi and Lydia (Auger) Ives, and was born in New Haven, Connecticut, February 7, 1779. He graduated from Yale University in 1799.  The two years after his graduation he spent as Rector of the Hopkins Grammar School in New Haven, at the same time studying medicine partly with his father and partly with Dr. Aeneas Munson. At a subsequent period he attended in Philadelphia the lectures of Drs Benjamin Rush and Caspar Wistar. In 1801 he began to practice his profession in New Haven, and was continuously engaged in a widely extended field, during a period
of over fifty years His eminence as a physician was recognized throughout the state, and even beyond its limits.
He was one of the originators of the Yale School of Medicine, and at its organization in 1813, was appointed
one of the first five professors. He held the chair of Materia Medica and Botany for sixteen years till in 1829 he was transferred to the chair of the Theory and Practice of Medicine.  In 1853 he ceased to be actively engaged in the Institution, and was named by the Corporation, Professor Emeritus. He was one of the founders of the New Haven Medical Association, and an active member of the Connecticut State Medical Society and many other local associations. In 1860, the American Medical Association at its meeting in New Haven, elected him President. While Professor in the Medical College he expended much time and effort in the maintenance of a Botanical Garden. He published four articles in early volumes of the American Journal of Science, an Oration before the Phi Beta Kappa Society in 1802, and an address before the New Haven Horticultural Society in 1837.

He married, Sept. 17, 1805, Maria, daughter of Deacon Nathan Beers, and had three sons and two daughters. He was honored and beloved for his eminent attainments and his many Christian virtues.  He died in New Haven, Conn., October 8, 1861, aged 82. A commemorative discourse was delivered at his funeral, by Rev. Dr. Dutton, and was printed in the New Englander, (Oct. 1861) and as a separate pamphlet.

References

Further reading
 

1779 births
1861 deaths
Yale University alumni
Yale School of Medicine faculty
Physicians from New Haven, Connecticut
Presidents of the American Medical Association